Washington Roberto Santana (born 25 March 1969), known professionally as Dum-Dum, is a Brazilian rapper.

He is a member and one of the founders of the Facção Central group next to the Carlos Eduardo Taddeo who decided to pursue a solo career.

Biography
Washington was born in São Paulo in 1969 and lived with a poor childhood. He started working early, at the age of eleven, delivering newspaper. As employment did not yield expected, he decided to become a fishmonger, profession where he served until 17, when he joined in a photolithographs company that went bankrupt.

Washington – which at the time had received the Dum-Dum nickname, placed by his grandmother in a black character comic – then decided to enter the world of crime, as a dealer, as well as marijuana and cocaine user. He was first arrested at age 27. Dum-Dum spent three months in jail, during which his daughter was born, to be acquitted for lack of evidence.

The first contact of Dum-Dum with rap happened in a show of Rational MCs group, the chief of Brazil in this style, and that's when the ex-con decided to turn singer. According to his own words, "If it was not rap I would not be alive." He joined the Central Faction in 1989, when the group had grown to three members, and remains the same to this day, with the production of eight jobs.

Discography

Compilations
1993 – Movimento Rap Vol. 2
1999 – Família Facção

Studio albums
1996 – Juventude de Atitude
1998 – Estamos de Luto
1999 – Versos Sangrentos
2001 – A Marcha Fúnebre Prossegue
2003 – Direto do Campo de Extermínio
2006 – O Espetáculo do Circo dos Horrores

Live albums
2005 – Facção Central – Ao Vivo

Singles
2015 – Cada Um Na Sua Função (Single)

References

Brazilian rappers
1969 births
Living people
Gangsta rappers